This is a list of some of the modern orders, decorations and medals of Spain.

The bulk of the top current civil and military decorations granted by the Government of Spain in a discretionary manner trace their origins back to the 19th and 20th centuries. The control of the military orders, a series of religious-military institutions created in the Middle Ages for military and borderland repopulation purposes in the Iberian Christian kingdoms, was seized by the Crown in the late 15th to early 16th century, and, from then on, Spanish monarchs became grand masters of the orders, entitling themselves with granting individuals the habits of the former as an award.

Provincial and municipal corporations (diputaciones and ayuntamientos) have a tradition for granting medals, and "adoptive" and "predilect" son/daughter as honorific titles. After the creation of autonomous communities in the late 20th century, regional administrations have also created their own set of civil decorations.

Historical orders of chivalry

The Spanish military orders or Spanish Medieval knights orders are a set of religious-military institutions which arose in the context of the Reconquista. The most important arose in the 12th century in the Crowns of León and Castile (Order of Santiago, Order of Alcántara and Order of Calatrava) and in the 14th century in the Crown of Aragon (Order of Montesa). They were preceded by many others that have not survived, such as the Aragonese Militia Christi of Alfonso of Aragon and Navarre, the Confraternity of Belchite (founded in 1122) or the Military order of Monreal (founded in 1124), which, after being refurbished by Alfonso VII of León and Castile took the name of Cesaraugustana and in 1149 with Ramon Berenguer IV, Count of Barcelona, are integrated into the Knights Templar. The Portuguese Order of Aviz responded to identical circumstances in the remaining peninsular Christian kingdom.

During the Middle Ages, as elsewhere in Christendom, in the Iberian Peninsula appeared native Military orders, that, while sharing many similarities with other international orders, also had their own peculiarities due to the special peninsular historical circumstances marked by the confrontation between Muslim and Christians.

The birth and expansion of these native orders came mostly at the stage of the Reconquista in which were occupied the territories south of the Ebro and Tagus, so their presence in those areas of La Mancha, Extremadura and Sistema Ibérico (Campo de Calatrava, Maestrazgo, etc.) came to mark the main feature of the Repoblación, in large areas in which each Order, through their encomiendas, exercised a political and economic role similar to that of manor feudal. The presence of other foreign military orders, such as the Templar or the Saint John was simultaneously, and in the case of the Knights Templar, their suppression in the 14th century benefited significantly to the Spanish.

The social implementation of the military orders between the noble families was very significant, extending even through related female orders (Comendadoras de Santiago and others similar).

After the turbulent period of the late medieval crisis—in which the position of Grand Master of the orders was the subject of violent disputes between the aristocracy, the monarchy and the favourites (infantes of Aragon, Álvaro de Luna, etc.)—Ferdinand II of Aragon, in the late 15th century, managed to neutralize the orders politically to obtain the papal concession of the unification in the person of that position for all of them, and its joint inheritance for its heirs, the kings of the later Catholic Monarchy, that administered through the Royal Council of the Military Orders.

Gradually losing any military function along the Antiguo Régimen, the territorial wealth of the military orders was the subject of confiscation in the 19th century, which reduced the orders thereafter to the social function of representing, as honorary positions, an aspect of noble status.

Birth and evolution

Although the appearance of the Hispanic military orders can be interpreted as pure imitation of the international arisen following the Crusades, both its birth and its subsequent evolution have distinctive features, as they played a leading role in the struggle of Christian kingdoms against the Muslims, in the repopulation of large territories, especially between the Tagus and the Guadalquivir and became a political and economic force of the first magnitude, besides having great role in the noble struggles held between the 13th and 15th centuries, when finally the Catholic Monarchs managed to gain its control.

For the Arabists, the birth of the Spanish military orders was inspired by the Muslims' ribat, but other authors believe that its appearance was the result of a merger of confraternities and council militias tinged with religiosity, by absorption and concentration gave rise to the large orders at a time when the struggle against Almohad power required every effort by the Christian side.non-objective statement - needs citation or source of some kind

Traditionally it is accepted that the first to appear was that of Order of Calatrava, born in that village of the Castilian kingdom in 1158, followed by that of Order of Santiago, founded in Cáceres, in the Leonese kingdom, in 1170. Six years later was created the Order of Alcántara, initially called ¨of San Julián del Pereiro¨. The last to appear was the Order of Montesa it did later on, during the 14th century, in the Crown of Aragon due to the dissolution of the Order of the Templar.

Hierarchical organization
Imitating the international orders, the Spanish adopted their organization. The master was the highest authority of the order, with almost absolute power, both militarily, and politically or religiously. It was chosen by the council, made up of thirteen friars, where it comes to its components the name of "Thirteens". The office of Master is life-time and in his death, the Thirteen, convened by the greater prior of the order, choose the new. It should be the removal of the master by incapacity or pernicious conduct for the order. To carry out it needed the agreement of its governing bodies: council of the thirteen, "greater prior" and "greater convent".

The General Chapter is a kind of representative assembly that controls the entire order. What are the thirteen, the priors of all the convents and all commanders. It should meet annually a certain day in the greater convent, although in the practice these meetings were held where and when the master wanted.

In each kingdom was a "greater commander", based in a town or fortress. The priors of each convent were elected by the canons, because it must bear in mind that within the orders were freyles milites (knights) and freyles clérigos, professed monks who taught and administering the sacraments.

Territorial organization

Because of their dual nature as military and religious institutions, territorially the orders develop a separate double organization for each of these areas, although sometimes not completely detached.

In the political-military these were divided into "major encomiendas" there greater encomienda by each peninsular kingdom in which was present the order in question. In front of them was the main commander. It was followed by the encomiendas, which were a set of goods, not always territorial nor grouped, but generally constituted territorial demarcations. The encomiendas were administered by a commander. The fortresses, that by any type of cause were not under the command of the commander, were headed by an alcaide appointed by him.

Religiously were organized by convents, existing a main convent, which was the headquarters of the order. In the case of the Order of Santiago was based in Uclés, after the rifts of the order with the Leonese monarch Ferdinand II. The Order of Alcántara had it in the Extremaduran village that gave it its name.

The convents were not only places where lived the professed monks, but constituted priories, religious territorial demarcations where the respective priors with the time had the same powers as the bishoprics, resulting in the military orders were subtracted to the episcopal power in extensive territories.

Army
The command of the army it exercised the highest dignities of each order. At the apex the master, followed by the main commanders. The figure of alférez was highlighted at beginning, but in the Middle Ages had disappeared. The command of the fortresses was in the hands of the commander or an alcaide appointed by him.

The recruitment was used to do by encomiendas, contributing presumably each with a number of lances or men related to the economic value of the demarcation.

Of note is the surprising bellicosity of the orders and its rigorous promise to fight the infidel, which often manifested itself in the continuation of authentic "private wars" against the Muslims when, for various reasons, the Christian kings gave up the struggle, because signing truces or to direct its military actions in other ways, as when Ferdinand III of Castile, crowned king of León, abandoned the interests of this kingdom to pursue the conquest of Andalusia in favor of the Crown of Castile.

Repopulation and social policy
To be important the military role played by the military orders, was no less its repopulater, economic and social role. Because not enough to wrest territories to the enemy if they are not populated enough to occupy and use it, thus facilitating their defense.

The orders received large tracts of land, whose repopulation reported it great political and economic power. To attract people to the acquired lands, they used similar methods to those used by other institutions. One was to grant fueros to the villages of their jurisdiction that made them attractive to people of the north. Generally it copied the models of fueros more generous, such as that of Cáceres or of Sepúlveda. An example of this generosity was the tax exemptions by marriage, taken from the Fuero of Usagre.

Moreover, some unproductive land were useless, so they worried about its economic development. In this sense, besides the advantages given to the new settlers, as the donations of disused public lands, were achieved fairs to their villages or were carried out important infrastructure works on the network communications. The fairs had the advantage of being tax-free, which fomented trade, which was also driven by improving communications (bridges, roads, etc.).

Relations with other institutions
The relations of the Hispanic military orders with other powers and institutions were diverse. Generally enjoyed the papal support, because they constituted a solid basis for the reconquista and depended directly on its authority. The Popes granted episcopal attributions to the priors of the orders in their struggle with the bishops, giving them greater independence.

As for the relationship with the kings, followed several stages. At first the monarchs impelled the Orders because they came to regard the "most precious jewel" of their crowns. Conscious of its enormous potential in the reconquest task, and later repopulation, the kings fostered it and introduced in their respective realms. As with Alfonso of Aragon and Navarre, when in 1122 he founded the confraternity of Belchite, or Alfonso VIII of Castile and Alfonso IX of León, who offered possessions to the orders of Santiago and Calatrava, respectively, lure it to their kingdoms. Although the royal donations for the most part were constituted by territories, to make them effective in the fight against Muslims, also received from the monarchs other donations not strictly military or political, such as those motivated by reasons of charity, mercy, hospitality and friendship. Often the favor of the kings also it manifested in the numerous lawsuits that arose with other powers, which generally the monarchs ruled in favor of the orders. The tax privileges or other were equally frequent, which sometimes caused the irritation of the concejos of realengo, whose neighbors paid tribute to a greater extent.

In exchange for the royal favor, the orders carried out the missions that were entrusted and were loyal to the monarchs, whose side were placed since the late 13th century the noble disputes became so frequent. Thereafter, the kings took conscience of the enormous power of the orders and the danger that could suppose having them against, hence with Alfonso XI of Castile began a struggle to get its control, to through the designation of the master. This struggle continued throughout the High Middle Ages until the absolute attainment of the royal purposes by the Catholic Monarchs, who managed to hold the mastership of all of them in perpetuity. With their descendants this mastership became hereditary.

More problematic was the relationship with the concejos of realengo (kind of councils of municipalities into royal territory), especially those endowed with extensive domains of difficult control and occupation. Often suffered the predation of unpopulated areas by the orders until the kings ended the usurpations, but from the 14th century these councils suffered the same predation by lay lords. There were also disputes with neighboring, sometimes prolonged and even so vehement that these produced physical confrontations.

Equally diverse resulted the relationship with the rest of the clergy. This contest of it was fundamental for the configuration of the orders, as happened with the support of the Archbishop of Santiago de Compostela regarding the order of Santiago or the bishop of Salamanca regarding that of the Alcántara. But later there was everything, from pious donations to endless lawsuits and skirmishes, and even some feat of arms, like the attack to the bishops of Cuenca and Sigüenza by the Santiago's commander of Uclés. And the tensions with the bishops were frequent in the struggle for the ecclesiastical jurisdiction, which were subtracted the priors, who finally received the papal support.

The brotherhood and coordination were the dominant attitudes in the relations between orders. Calatrava and Alcántara were united by relations of affiliation, without incurring lack of autonomy of Alcántara. There were agreements between orders of mutual aid and sharing the archived. Even agreements such as the tripartite of friendship, mutual defense, coordination and centralization signed in 1313 by Santiago, Calatrava and Alcántara.

Dissolution

The Military Orders were dissolved on April 29 of 1931 by the Republican government.

During the Spanish Civil War, many non-militant, non-criminal, civilian leading members of the Orders were killed, their knights in the crosshairs of ideological revolutionists, put to death for revolutionary agendas: minimally, at least nineteen of the Military Order of Santiago, fifteen of the Military Order of Calatrava, five of the Military Order of Alcántara and four of the Military Order of Montesa were executed. These numbers are conservative in fact and unconfirmed, but doubtless, ideologically-inspired killings of those with serious ties to these Orders, existed beyond official recorded numbers - regardless of class, any persons intimately associated with these pre-modern Orders were targets of revolutionary assassinations and the death-toll was likely higher.

The "officially" tabulated balance of Knights of 1931 to 1935 in the midst of the chaos was as follows:
 Military Order of Santiago, 68 of 116.
 Military Order of Calatrava, 89 of 139.
 Military Order of Alcántara, 19 of 42.
 Military Order of Montesa, 51 of 70.

In 1985 only 19 documentation-verified knights, who professed a dedication before approximately 1931, remained of what was once a grand edifice of social significance to Spanish and greater European society.

Revival
After the Spanish Civil War there began talks with the caudillo Francisco Franco, whose social policy's central axis was synthesizing modernity with past traditional elements of redeeming value, who invited the bishop-prior, Emeterio Echeverría Barrena, to an exchange productive of no tangible results, so over the following years they subsisted marginally or informally, until, exoterically, on April 2 of 1980, they were recorded separately on the record of associations of Civil Government of Madrid. On May 26 of that year they are registered as "federation". The Order of Santiago, along with those of Calatrava, Alcántara and Montesa were reinstated as civil associations in the reign of Juan Carlos I with the character of honorable and religious noble organization and as such remain today.

The 9 April 1981, and after fifty years, the King of Spain, Juan Carlos I, named his father Juan of Bourbon President of the Royal Council of the Military Orders. Since 28 April 2014, Don Pedro of Bourbon, Duke of Noto, is the current President of the Royal Council.

List
Medieval knights orders founded in Spain (by alphabetic order) 
(Note: This list, at this moment, does not include the military orders of the rest of Europe that participated in the Reconquista, among which for example the Knights Templar and the Knights Hospitaller could highlight):

Female orders
Most were honorific orders in payment of efforts by warrior girls attacking Muslims (and in some cases attacking English), and their high contribution to the reconquest of cities, some however came to become actually in female military orders.

Both Medieval naval and knights orders, fulfilling dual function, but mainly naval

Current orders of chivalry
The Catholic Monarchs Queen Isabella I of Castile and King Ferdinand II of Aragon introduced a military honours system which was approved by the Pope Adrian VI in 1523. They awarded titles and hereditary honours to nobles and soldiers. Of those titles the following exist today:

 Orden de Calatrava (Order of Calatrava), St. Raymond of Fitero, first abbott of the cistercian monastery of Fitero (Navarre), 1158.
 Order of Santiago (Order of  Santiago), King Ferdinand II of León, 1170.
 Order of Alcántara (Order of  Alcántara), St. Julian de Pereiro, 1176.
 Orden de Santa María de Montesa y San Jorge de Alfama (Order de St. Mary of Montesa and St. George of Alfama) commonly known as Orden de Montesa (Order of Montesa), King James II of Aragon and Pope John XXII, 1317.
 Orden de San Juan (Order of St. John)
 Orden del Santo Sepulcro (Order of the Holy Sepulchre)

Dynastic order 
 The Insigne Orden del Toisón de Oro (Insigned Order of the Golden Fleece), is a chivalrous Order founded in 1430 by the Duke of Burgundy, Philip III of Burgundy. It was established in Spain by Philip II, although his father Charles I attempted to found it before him.

Military honours

 Real y militar Orden de San Fernando (Royal & Military Order of Saint Fernand)
 Medalla Militar (Military Medal)
 Cruz de Guerra (War Cross)
 Medalla del Ejército (Army Medal)
 Medalla Naval (Navy Medal)
 Medalla Aérea (Air Force Medal)
 Cruces del Mérito Militar (Crosses of Military Merit) – Royal Decree 1040/2003
 Cruces del Mérito Naval (Crosses of Naval Merit) – Royal Decree 1040/2003
 Cruces del Mérito Aeronáutico (Crosses of Air Force Merit) – Royal Decree 1040/2003
 Real y Militar Orden de San Hermenegildo (Royal and Military Order of Saint Hermenegild)
 Cruz a la Constancia en el Servicio (Long Military Service Cross)
 Cruz Fidélitas (Fidelity Cross)
 Medalla de Campaña (Campaign Medal)
 Medal of the Century of Our Lady of the Pillar as Patron of the Spanish Civil Guard
 Medal of the V Centenary of Saint Barbara as Patron of the Artillery Weapon

Other Military Awards
 Citación como Distinguido (Distinguished Service Award)
 Mención Honorífica (Mention in dispatches)

International Military Decorations
 The Medalla al Servicio de la Política Europea de Seguridad y Defensa (Common Security and Defence Policy Service Medal)
 The Medalla de las Naciones Unidas (United Nations Medal)
 The Medalla de la OTAN (NATO Medal)
 NATO Serge Lazareff Prize

Obsolete
   Real y Militar Orden de María Cristina (Royal and Military Order of Maria Christina) (1889–1931)
   Real y Militar Orden Naval de María Cristina (Royal and Military Naval Order of Maria Christina) (1891–1931)
  Medalla de Sufrimientos por la Patria (Medal of Suffering for the Motherland) (1814–1989)
 Medalla del Mutilado (Medal of the Maimed)  (1938–1989)
 Medalla del Sáhara (Sahara Medal)  (1977)
Obsolete International Military Decorations
 The Medalla de Servicio de la Unión Europea Occidental (WEU Service Medal)

Civil decorations

Background 

  The Real y Distinguida Orden Española de Carlos III (Royal and Distinguished Spanish Order of Charles III), Established by Charles III in 1771 to decorate those having benefited Spain and her Crown by the actions. It is the highest civil decoration that exists in Spain.
  The Real Orden de Isabel la Católica (Royal Order of Isabella the Catholic), established by Fernand VII in 1815, to “reward unflinching loyalty to Spain and the merits of Spanish and foreign subjects in benefit of the Nation and especially those services relating to the prosperity of the American and other overseas territories”. The decoration is currently the responsibility of the Ministry of Foreign Affairs.
  The Orden del Mérito Civil (Order of Civil Merit), established by Alfonso XIII in 1926 to “reward the civic virtues of civil servants as well as the extraordinary services to the Nation of Spanish and foreign subjects”. It too is currently the responsibility of the Ministry of Foreign Affairs.

Politics and justice

 The Orden de la Cruz de San Raimundo de Peñafort (Order of the Cross of Saint Raymond of Penyafort), established in 1944 to “reward relevant merits performed by those persons involved in the administration of Justice and for their contribution and study of all branches of Law and for the untarnished services to judicial activities under the responsibility of the Ministry of Justice. Depende de la Subsecretaría de Justicia, a través de la División de Tramitación de Derechos de Gracia y Otros Derechos, y dentro de la orden existen diversas cruces y medallas.
 The Orden del Mérito Constitucional (Order of Constitutional Merit), established by Felipe Gonzalez’s government in 1988 to “reward those persons who distinguish themselves by their services to the Constitution and of the values established therein”. It can be awarded both to persons or organizations (public or private).
 The Orden de Cisneros (Order of Cisneros), founded in 1944 to reward political merit. It is one of the least known decorations still in existence today.
 The Real Orden de Reconocimiento Civil a las Víctimas del Terrorismo (Royal Order for Civil Recognition of the Victims of Terrorism), created in 1991, in order to honour those killed, wounded or kidnapped by terrorists. It consists of a Grand Cross, that can be awarded posthumously to the deceased and a Commendation, for those injured and kidnapped.
The Medalla de Oro del Senado (Gold Medal of the Senate)
The Medalla de Oro del Congreso de los Diputados (Gold Medal of the Congress of Deputies)

Culture and society
  The Orden Civil de Alfonso X el Sabio (Civil Order of Alfonso X the Wise), founded in 1945 with the aim of to “reward relevant merits in the fields of education, science, culture, higher education and research”. In 1988 this order replaced the Civil Order of Alfonso XII.
 The Orden de las Artes y las Letras de España (Order of Arts and Letters of Spain)
 The Real Orden del Mérito Deportivo (Royal Order of Sports Merit)
 The Medalla al Mérito en la Investigación y en la Educación Universitaria (Medal of Merit for Research and for University Education)
The Medalla al Mérito Filatélico (Medal of Philatelic Merit)
The Medalla al Mérito de la Radioafición (Medal of Merit for Radio Operators)
 The Medalla al Mérito en las Bellas Artes (Medal of Merit in the Fine Arts)

Social affairs
 The Orden Civil de la Solidaridad Social (Civil Order of Social Solidarity), established in 1988 to replace the old 'Orden de Beneficencia' (Order of Charity) with the aim of “recognizing persons or organizations, both Spanish and foreign having distinguished themselves in promoting or performing activities related to social welfare”.
 The Orden Civil de Sanidad (Civil Order of Health), created in 1943 to replace the old Cross of Epidemias, to the end of “rewarding service and merit in the ambit of medical care or in the course of assistance in fighting epidemias”.
The Orden al Mérito del Plan Nacional sobre Drogas (Order of Merit of the National Drug Plan), established in 1995, it comprises 3 levels: Gold medal, for those who “have distinguished themselves in the performance of their activities or for achievements of special significance or importance, or that entailed a risk to their life, both in prevention, assistance, reinsertion or in combating drug trafficking as well as its consequences or derived illicit earnings”; Silver medal, for those “having carried out or carrying out noteworthy activities with continued dedication and solidarity, in the above mentioned areas, taking into account their real results”; White cross, for those “having shown exemplary and significant dedication in the above mentioned reas”.
The Orden Civil del Mérito Medioambiental (Civil Order of Environmental Merit), created in 2009 to reward persons and organizations for eminent services or out-standing actions, for nature conservation, natural heritage and biodiversity preservation, the fight against climate change, environmental quality, the defense and promotion of the marine water and continental resources sustainability and, in general, initiatives on environmental protection.
The Medalla al Mérito Social Penitenciario (Medal of Social Penitentiary Merit), introduced in 1996, intended to reward those individuals or institutions that have contributed to the prison rehabilitation.
The Medalla de Honor de la Emigración (Medal of Honour of Emigration)
The Medalla y Placa a la Promoción de los Valores de Igualdad (Equality Values Promotion Medal and Plaque)
The Medalla de la Seguridad Social (Medal of Social Security)
The Distinciones de la Cruz Roja Española (Spanish Red Cross Decorations)
The Medalla del Donante de Sangre (Blood Donor Medal)

Security
 The Orden del Mérito del Cuerpo de la Guardia Civil (Order of Merit of the Civil Guard Corps)
 The Orden del Mérito Policial (Order of Police Merit)
 The Medalla al Mérito de la Protección Civil (Medal of Merit of Civil Defence)
The Medalla al Mérito de la Seguridad Vial (Medal of Merit of Road Security)
The Medalla al Mérito Penitenciario (Medal of Penitentiary Merit)
 The Condecoración a la Dedicación al Servicio Policial (Police Service Decoration)

Socioeconomics 
 The Orden Civil del Mérito de Telecomunicaciones y de la Sociedad de la Información (Civil Order of Merit for Telecommunications and Information Society)
 The Orden Civil del Mérito Postal (Civil Order of Postal Merit)
 The Orden del Mérito Agrario, Pesquero y Alimentario (Order of Agricultural, Fishing and Alimentary Merit)
 The Medalla y Placa al Mérito Turístico (Touristic Merit Medal and Plaque)
 The Medalla y Placa al Mérito del Transporte Terrestre (Land Transport Merit Medal and Plaque)
 The Medalla y Placa al Mérito de la Marina Mercante (Merchant Marine Merit Medal and Plaque)
  The Medalla al Mérito en el Trabajo (Medal of Merit for Labour)
 The Medalla al Mérito en el Seguro (Insurance Merit Medal)
 The Medalla y Placa al Mérito en el Comercio (Commerce Merit Medal and Plaque)

Regions
The Medalla de Andalucia (Medal of Andalusia)
The Medalla de las Cortes de Aragón (Medal of Aragonese Corts)
The Medalla de Asturias (Medal of Asturias)
The Medalla de Oro de Canarias (Gold Medal of Canary Islands)
The Medalla de Oro de las Islas Baleares (Gold Medal of Balearic Islands)
The Medalla del Parlamento de Cantabria (Gold Medal of the Parliament of Cantabria)
The Medalla de Extremadura (Medalla de Extremadura)
The Medalla de Oro de Castilla-La Mancha (Gold Medal of Castile-La Mancha)
The Medalla y Placa al Mérito Deportivo en Castilla-La Mancha (Sports Merit in Castile-La Mancha Medal and Plaque)
The Medalla y Placa al Mérito Sanitario en Castilla-La Mancha (Health Merit in Castile-La Mancha Medal and Plaque)
The Medalla al Mérito en la Iniciativa Social de Castilla-La Mancha (Social Initiatives of Castile-La Mancha Medal)
The Medalla de Castilla y León (Castile and León Medal)
The Medalla al Mérito Profesional de Castilla y León (Professional Merit Medal of Castile and León)
The Medalla de las Cortes de Castilla y León (Corts of Castile and León Medal)
The Medalla al Mérito Parliamentario (Parliamentary Merit Medal), Castile and León
The Medalla d'Or de la Generalitat de Catalunya (Gold Medal of the Generalitat of Catalonia)
The Premi Creu de Sant Jordi (Cross of St. George Award), Catalonia.
The Medalla de Galicia (Medal of Galicia)
The Medalla Castelao (Castelao Medal), Galicia
The Medalla de La Rioja (Medal of La Rioja)
The Orden del Dos de Mayo (Order of the Second of May), Merit Order of the Community of Madrid.
The Medalla de la Comunidad de Madrid (Medal of the Community of Madrid)
The Medalla de la Región de Murcia (Medal of the Region of Murcia)
The Medalla de Oro de Navarra (Gold Medal of Navarre)
The Cruz de Carlos III El Noble de Navarra  (Charles III the Noble of Navarre Cross), Navarre
The Cross of the Tree of Gernika medal, Basque Country
The Lan Onari medal, Basque Country
The Lagun Onari medal, Basque Country
Distinciones de la Generalitat Valenciana (Valencian Community Distinctions)
The Orden de Jaume I el Conqueridor (James I the Conqueror Order), Valencian Community

Autonomous cities
The Medalla de la Autonomía de Ceuta (Medal of Autonony of Ceuta)
The Medalla de la Ciudad de Melilla (City of Melilla Medal)

Others
 The Orden de las Damas Nobles de María-Luisa (Order of the Noble Ladies of Queen Maria Luisa)
 The Medalla Plus Ultra (Plus Ultra Medal)
 The Medalla al Mérito en el Ahorro (Merit in Savings Medal), Spanish Confederation of Savings Banks Medal.

Obsolete

The Real y Militar Orden de España (Royal and Militar Order of Spain), Joseph Bonaparte (1809–1812)
The Orden Civil de María Victoria (Civil Order of María Victoria), King Amadeo (1871–1873).
The Orden Civil de Alfonso XII (Civil Order of Alfonso XII), Alfonso XIII (1902–1931) Officially replaced by the Civil Order of Alfonso X, the Wise (1988)
The Orden de la República Española (Order of the Spanish Republic), Second Republic (1932–1939).
The Orden Imperial del Yugo y las Flechas (Imperial Order of the Yoke and Arrows), Francisco Franco (1937–1976).

See also
Spanish chivalry
List of honours of Spain awarded to heads of state and royalty

References

External links